Samraong Knong  is a khum (commune) of Aek Phnum District in Battambang Province in north-western Cambodia.

Villages

 Samraong Knong
 Kampong Sambuor
 Samraong Snao
 Samraong Ou Trea
 Samraong Ta Kok

References

Communes of Battambang province
Aek Phnum District